Mobile Suit Gundam ZZ is a 1986 Japanese science fiction anime television series created and directed by Yoshiyuki Tomino and produced by Nagoya Broadcasting Network, Sotsu Agency, and Sunrise with music production by Starchild Records. Mobile Suit Gundam ZZ is the sequel to the 1986 Japanese science fiction series Mobile Suit Zeta Gundam. Spanning 47 episodes, the series premiered in Japan on Nagoya Broadcasting Network on March 1, 1986 and concluded on January 31, 1987.

Four pieces of theme music are used over the course of the series—two opening themes and two closing themes.

Bandai said that they had no plans for an English dub and it is unlikely that there will be one in the future, due to the shutdown of Bandai Entertainment.

Episode list 

Mobile Suit Gundam ZZ
ZZ